Robert Newell VC (1835 – 11 July 1858) was an English recipient of the Victoria Cross, the highest and most prestigious award for gallantry in the face of the enemy that can be awarded to British and Commonwealth forces.

Private Newell was approximately 23 years old, and a private in the 9th Lancers of the British Army when the following deed on 19 March 1857, during the Indian Mutiny at Lucknow, India led to the award of the Victoria Cross:

He died four months later in India on 11 July 1858. His VC is on display in the Lord Ashcroft Gallery at the Imperial War Museum, London.

References

1835 births
1858 deaths
9th Queen's Royal Lancers soldiers
British recipients of the Victoria Cross
Indian Rebellion of 1857 recipients of the Victoria Cross
People from Seaham
Deaths from dysentery
British Army recipients of the Victoria Cross
Military personnel from County Durham
Burials in India